Twicecoaster: Lane 2 is the reissue of South Korean girl group Twice's third extended play (EP) Twicecoaster: Lane 1. It was released digitally and physically on February 20, 2017, by JYP Entertainment. It contains thirteen tracks, including the lead single, "Knock Knock".

Background and release
On January 18, 2017, it was reported that Twice would be releasing a special album after their concert in Seoul. In early February, Twice officially announced the release of the reissue of Twicecoaster: Lane 1, titled Twicecoaster: Lane 2, on February 20 with the brand new track "Knock Knock".

The track list for Twicecoaster: Lane 2 was revealed on February 12. It contains thirteen tracks: the seven songs from the original release, additional two new songs, a remix version and instrumental of "TT", as well as the instrumental tracks of "Like Ooh-Ahh" from The Story Begins and "Cheer Up" from Page Two. The group concept images and individual teasers of Twice were released in the next four days.

Two music video teasers for "Knock Knock" were released on February 17 and 18 at midnight. The first teaser started with the sound of knock which was heard on the ending of the music video for "TT", while the second teaser showed the members dressed in a variety of outfits that flash by in the stop-motion video.

The final group image teaser was released on February 19 at midnight. Twice also greeted the fans via Naver V Live for a comeback countdown at 23:30 KST. The album, along with the music video for "Knock Knock", was officially released the next day. It was also released as a digital download on various music sites.

Promotion
On February 20, 2017, Twice had a live broadcast on Naver V Live at 20:00 KST to celebrate their comeback with fans. The group talked about the album, the title track "Knock Knock" and its music video, as well as their first solo concert which was held on February 17–19 and Asian tour. They also performed the full choreography of "Knock Knock" for the first time.

The next day, Twice recorded their appearance on the February 25th episode of You Hee-yeol's Sketchbook, their first variety show for Twicecoaster: Lane 2. The group's appearance was included in the show's special monthly episodes with the concept "songs I want to sing for those in their 20s."

On February 23, Twice held their first comeback stage on M Countdown. It was then followed by performances on the February 24th, 25th and 26th episode of Music Bank, Show! Music Core and Inkigayo, respectively. continued on the March 7th episode of The Show, and Show Champion on the 8th.

The group ended their music show promotions on the March 12th episode of Inkigayo.

Commercial performance
Twicecoaster: Lane 2 entered the Gaon Album Chart at number 1 and the Billboard World Albums at number 4, while its title track, "Knock Knock", entered the Gaon Digital Chart at number 1 and the Billboard World Digital Songs at number 5.

The album had sold 266,645 units in February 2017.

Track listing

Content production
Credits adapted from album liner notes.

Locations

 Recording
 JYPE Studios, Seoul, South Korea
 Prelude Studio, Seoul, South Korea
 Trinity Sound Studio, Seoul, South Korea
 Paradise Music Studio, Seoul, South Korea
 U Productions Studio A, Seoul, South Korea
 Kairos Music Group, Los Angeles, California

 Mixing
 JYPE Studios, Seoul, South Korea
 In Grid Studio, Seoul, South Korea
 W Sound Studio, Seoul, South Korea
 Echo Bar Studios, Los Angeles, California

 Mastering
 Sonic Korea, Seoul, South Korea
 Sterling Sound, New York City, New York
 The Mastering Palace, New York City, New York

Personnel

 J. Y. Park "The Asiansoul" – producer
 Min Lee "collapsedone" – co-producer, all instruments and computer programming (on "Knock Knock")
 Mayu Wakisaka – co-producer and background vocals (on "Knock Knock")
 Sim Eun-jee – co-producer
 Lee Ji-young – direction and coordination (A&R)
 Jang Ha-na – music (A&R)
 Nam Jeong-min – music (A&R)
 Kim Ji-hyeong – production (A&R)
 Choi A-ra – production (A&R)
 Kim Bo-hyeon – design (A&R) and album design
 Kim Tae-eun - design (A&R) and album design
 Choi Hye-jin – recording and assistant mixing engineer
 Im Hong-jin – recording engineer
 Eom Se-hee – recording engineer
 Kim Yong-woon "goodear" – recording and mixing engineer
 Jo Han-sol "Fabio the Asian" – recording and assistant mixing engineer
 Lee Chang-seon – recording engineer
 Kim Si-cheol – recording engineer
 Yang Jeong-nam – recording engineer
 Brian U – recording engineer
 Kang Yeon-noo – recording engineer
 Park Sang-rok – assistant recording engineer
 Han Cheol-gyu – assistant recording engineer
 Jang Hong-seok – assistant recording engineer 
 Wes Koz – assistant recording engineer and acoustic guitar (on "Next Page")
 Kevin Wong "Koncept" – assistant recording engineer
 Lee Tae-seob – mixing engineer
 Jeong Eun-kyeong – mixing engineer
 Jo Joon-seong – mixing engineer
 Bob Horn – mixing engineer
 Tak – mixing engineer, all instruments and computer programming (on "TT (Tak Remix)")
 Choi Ja-yeon – assistant mixing engineer
 Park Jeong-eon – mastering engineer
 Chris Gehringer – mastering engineer
 Dave Kutch – mastering engineer
 Will Quinnell – assistant mastering engineer
 Kim Young-jo (Naive Creative Production) – music video director
 Yoo Seung-woo (Naive Creative Production) – music video director
 Kim Young-joon (Agency Seed) – photographer
 Choi Hee-seon – style director
 Im Ji-hyeon – style director
 Park Nae-joo – hair director
 Won Jeong-yo – makeup director
 Kim Hyeong-woong – choreographer
 Yoon Hee-so – choreographer
 Lee Ji-hyeon – choreographer
 Jiggy Choi Young-joon – choreographer
 Today Art – printing
 Jowul – vocal production (on "Ice Cream")
 Choi Han-sol – computer programming (on "Ice Cream")
 Pink Hound – computer programming (on "Ice Cream")
 Jeong Jae-pil – guitar (on "Ice Cream")
 Lee Jeong-woo – bass (on "Ice Cream")
 Son Min-kyeong – background vocals (on "Ice Cream")
 Jeong Yoo-ri (CaSSeTTe08) – additional engineering (on "Ice Cream")
 Rado – all instruments and computer programming (on "TT", "Like Ooh-Ahh (Inst.)", "Cheer Up (Inst.)" and "TT (Inst.)")
 Jihyo – background vocals (on "TT")
 Nayeon – background vocals (on "TT")
 Noday – all instruments, keyboard and computer programming (on "1 to 10")
 Chloe – all instruments, keyboard, computer programming and background vocals (on "1 to 10")
 Kwon Phillip – guitar (on "1 to 10")
 Yoon Woo-seon – piano (on "Ponytail")
 Kim Ki-wook – bass (on "Ponytail")
 Hong Joon-ho – guitar (on "Ponytail")
 Lee Gyu-hyeong – drum (on "Ponytail")
 Lee Dae-hee – synthesizer (on "Ponytail")
 Kim So-hyeon – chorus (on "Ponytail") and background vocals (on "Pit-a-Pat")
 east4A – all instruments and computer programming (on "Jelly Jelly")
 Jeong Jin-ha – background vocals (on "Jelly Jelly")
 Im Kwang-wook – all instruments and computer programming (on "Pit-a-Pat")
 Kang Ji-won – all instruments and computer programming (on "Pit-a-Pat")
 Joe J. Lee "Kairos" – all instruments and vocal production (on "Next Page")
 Hobyn "K.O" Yi – all instruments, keyboards, computer programming and vocal production (on "Next Page")
 Samuel J Lee – bass and vocal production (on "Next Page")
 Esther Park "Legaci" – background vocals and vocal production (on "Next Page")
 Bei Zhang – background vocals (on "Next Page")
 Wes Kosakowski – additional engineering (on "Next Page")
 Sebastian Thott – all instruments, computer programming and guitars (on "One in a Million")
 Andreas Öberg – guitars (on "One in a Million")
 Lee Da-jeong – background vocals (on "One in a Million")

Charts

Weekly charts

Year-end charts

Accolades

Release history

References

2017 EPs
Twice (group) EPs
JYP Entertainment EPs
Genie Music EPs
Korean-language EPs
Dance-pop albums by South Korean artists
Reissue albums